Russell Hill may refer to:

 Russell Hill (artist) (born 1988), British artist
 Russell Hill (footballer) (1920–1987), Australian rules footballer
 Russell Hill (war correspondent), see New York Herald Tribune
 Russell Hill, Croydon, an area in the London Borough of Croydon
 Russell Hill, a geographic feature Wyoming County, Pennsylvania

See also 
 1995 Russell Hill subway accident, a deadly train crash that occurred in Toronto, Ontario, Canada